Edwin Semzaba was a Tanzanian novelist, playwright, actor and director. He wrote his works mainly in Swahili. He taught in the Department of Fine and Performing Arts at the University of Dar es Salaam, Tanzania, where he taught, among other courses, creative writing and acting.
He won the first award of East African Writers awarded by the Institute of Swahili Research (Taasisi ya Unchunguzi wa Kiswahili, TUKI) for his novel Funke Bugebuge and the "grandchildren's adventure book writing competition" awarded by the Swedish Embassy in Tanzania (2007).

Semzaba died January 17, 2016.

Novels 
 Marimba ya Majaliwa, E & D Vision Publishing, 2008
 Funke Bugebuge, Dar es Salaam University Press, 1999.
 Tausi wa Alfajiri, HEKO Publishers, 1996
 Tamaa ya Boimandaa Dar es Salaam University Press,2002
 "The Adventures of Tunda and Zamaradi", Exodia Publishers LTD. 2016.

Plays 
 Kinyamkera, Exodia Publishers, 2014.
 Joseph na Josephine, Exodia Publishers, 2014.
 Ngoswe, Dar es Salaam University Press, 1996.
 MkokoteniExodia Publishers,2014
 Tendehogo Tanzania Publishing House (TPH), 1982
 Sofia wa Gongolambotoa Benedictine Publications, Ndanda,1985.

Awards and honors 
 First Prize Winner Western Zone Sabasaba Writing /Reciting Poetry competition at Kigoma 1967.
 Best Actor Award at Mkwawa High School    - 1971-1972
 First Prize Winner Playwriting Competition Literature Dept (UDSM) 1975
 First Prize Winner, Novel Writing Competition East African Literature Bureau and TUKI(UDSM) 1976.
 First Prize Winner SIDA Children Adventure Book Competition,2007.
 First Winner of the Round Six Burt Award for African Literature Writing Competition, 2016

References 

Living people
Tanzanian male actors
Swahili-language writers
Tanzanian novelists
Tanzanian dramatists and playwrights
Year of birth missing (living people)
Academic staff of the University of Dar es Salaam